Barcelona International Comic Fair is an annual fair and convention of authors, publishers and comic readers, managed by .
It takes place in the city of Barcelona since 1981, and is an event of reference on the Spanish comic market.

Prizes
The Prizes are awarded to the best works published on the year preceding the Convention. An exception is the Gran Premi del Saló (Grand Prize of the Barcelona International Comics Convention), which is awarded to an author based on his entire career.

The most relevant prizes are:
Prize to the Best Work, for comics published in Spanish on the last year.
Prize to the Best Script, awarded since 1995.
Prize "Josep Toutain" to the Best New Talent.
Best Foreign Work published in Spain.
Prize to the Best fanzine.
Prize to the Best Comics Magazine.

Grand Prize of the Barcelona International Comic Fair
1988 - Alfons Figueras
1989 - Ambrós
1990 - Manuel Vázquez
1991 - Jordi Bernet
1992 - Raf
1993 - Alfonso Font
1994 - Francisco Ibáñez
1995 - Kim
1996 - Josep Sanchis
1997 - Enrique Ventura
1998 - Víctor Mora
1999 - Miguel and Pedro Quesada
2000 - Max
2001 - 
2002 - Jan
2003 - Josep María Beà
2004 - Horacio Altuna
2005 - Carlos Giménez
2006 - Víctor de la Fuente
2007 - Miguelanxo Prado
2008 - Pasqual Ferry 
2009 - Ana Miralles
2010 - Rubén Pellejero
2011 - Jordi Longarón
2012 - José Ortiz
2013 - Purita Campos

Best Work
1988 - El licantropunk (Max)
1989 - Quotidiania Delirante (Miguelanxo Prado)
1990 - Doctor Vértigo (Martí)
1991 - Mi cabeza bajo el mar (Pere Joan)
1992 - Perro Nick (Miguel Ángel Gallardo)
1993 - El octavo día (Daniel Torres)
1994 - Trazo de tiza (Miguelanxo Prado)
1995 - Museum (Fernando De Felipe)
1996 - Como perros (Max)
1997 - El artefacto perverso (Felipe Hernández Cava / Federico del Barrio)
1998 - El pie frito (Miguel Calatayud)
1999 - Lope de Aguirre. La expiación (Ricard Castells / Felipe Hernández Cava)
2000 -  (Carlos Giménez)
2001 - Blacksad: un lugar entre las sombras (Juan Díaz / Juanjo Guarnido)
2002 - Cosecha Rosa (José Luis Ágreda)
2003 - 4 botas (Keko)
2004 - Mantecatos (Manel Fontdevila)
2005 - La mansión de los Pampín (Miguelanxo Prado)
2006 - Blacksad 3. Alma Roja (Juan Díaz / Juanjo Guarnido)
2007 - Bardín el superrealista (Max)
2008 - Arrugas (Paco Roca)
2009 - Las serpientes ciegas (Felipe Hernández Cava/Bartolomé Seguí)
2010 - El arte de volar (Antonio Altarriba/Kim)
2011 - El invierno del dibujante (Paco Roca)
2012 - Aventuras de un oficinista japonés (José Domingo)
2013 - Ardalén (Miguelanxo Prado)

Best Script
1995 - Perico Carambola, de Ignacio Vidal-Folch. 
1996 - La parejita, de Manel Fontdevila.
1997 - El artefacto perverso, de Felipe Hernández Cava. 
1998 - Nosotros somos los muertos, de Max. 
1999 - Lope de Aguirre. La expiación, de Felipe Hernández Cava.
2000 - , de Carlos Giménez.
2001 - Tabú, de Jorge Zentner. 
2002 - El hombre con miedo, de Hernán Migoya. 
2003 - Atravesado por la flecha, de Luis Durán.
2004 - Antoine de las tormentas, de Luis Durán.
2005 - La mansión de los Pampín, de Miguelanxo Prado.
2006 - Carlitos Fax, d'Albert Monteys.
2007 - Bardín el superrealista, de Max.
2008 - Arrugas, de Paco Roca.
2009 - Las serpientes ciegas, de Felipe Hernández Cava.
2010 - El arte de volar, de Antonio Altarriba.
2011 - El invierno del dibujante, de Paco Roca.

Prize "Josep Toutain" to the Best New Talent
1988 - Josep Mª Beroy
1989 - Pasqual Ferry
1990 - Jaime Martín
1991 - Joaquín López Cruces
1992 - Miguel Ángel Martín
1993 - Calpurnio
1994 - Mauro Entrialgo
1995 - Pep Brocal
1996 - Santiago Sequeiros
1997 - Albert Monteys
1998 - María Colino
1999 - Ramón F. Bachs i Sergio Córdoba (ex aequo)
2000 - Álex Fito
2001 - Juanjo Guarnido
2002 - Luis Durán
2003 - Víctor Santos
2004 - Fermín Solís
2005 - Raquel Alzate
2006 - Pablo Auladell
2007 - David Rubín
2008 - Carlos Areces
2009 - Pere Mejan
2010 - Alfonso Zapico
2011 - David Sánchez
2012 - Lola Lorente
2013 - Oriol Hernández Sánchez

Best Foreign Work published in Spain
1989 - Fuegos (Lorenzo Mattotti)
1990 - Maus (Art Spiegelman)
1991 - Calvin y Hobbes (Bill Watterson)
1992 - El condón asesino (Ralf König)
1993 - Las mujeres perdidas (Jaime Hernández)
1994 - Informe sobre ciegos (Alberto Breccia)
1995 - Magnor el poderoso (Sergio Aragonés)
1996 - Odio (Peter Bagge)
1997]- Río Veneno (Beto Hernández)
1998 - El Club de la Sangre (Charles Burns)
1999 - La ciudad de cristal (David Mazzucchelli / Paul Karasik)
2000 - 300 (Frank Miller)
2001 - Ghost World (Daniel Clowes)
2002 - Maus (Art Spiegelman)
2003 - David Boring (Daniel Clowes)
2004 - Barrio Lejano (Jiro Taniguchi)
2005 - Jimmy Corrigan, el chico más listo del mundo (Chris Ware)
2006 - 20th Century Boys (Naoki Urasawa)
2007 - Ice Haven (Daniel Clowes)
2008 - S (Gipi) 
2009 - La educación de Hopey Glass (Jaime Hernández) 
2010 - Genésis de Robert Crumb
2011 - Los muertos vivientes (Robert Kirkman/Charlie Adlard)
2012 - Arzak el vigilante (Mœbius)
2013 - Portugal (Cyril Pedrosa)

Best Fanzine
1989 - Sólo para Locos
1990 - TMEO
1991 - Urich / Pogo
1992 - El Maquinista
1993 - El Nuevo Maquinista
1994 - Mondo Lirondo
1995 - Paté de Marrano
1996 - Annabel Lee
1997 - rAu / Kovalski Fly
1998 - Idiota y Diminuto
1999 - Como Vacas Mirando el Tren
2000 - Amaníaco
2001 - TMEO
2002 - Amaníaco
2003 - El Naufraguito
2004 - Cretino
2005 - BD Banda
2006 - Cabezabajo
2007 - Barsowia
2008 - Fanzine enfermo 
2009 - Rantifuso
2010 - Gato Negro
2011 - El Naufraguito
2012 - Usted
2013 - Adobo

Best Comics Magazine
2003 - 
2004 - El Víbora
2005 - Mister K
2006 - El Jueves
2007 - NSLM
2008 - El Manglar
2009 - Amaniaco
2010 - Dos veces breve
2011 - Dolmen

Prize for Industry Support
2007 - Toni Guiral
2008 - Manuel Darias
2009 - Álvaro Pons
2010 - Entrecomics
2011 - Santiago García

Prize for Best Retailer
2009 - Continuarà Comics  
2010 - Espacio Sins Entido
2011 - Madrid Comics

Prize to the best comic-based film
2011 - María y yo de Félix Fernández de Castro

References

External links
 
Barcelona International Comics Convention news coverage

Comics awards
Comics conventions
Comics-related lists
Lists of award winners